Grenfell Beach is a hamlet on Crooked Lake in Saskatchewan. It is part of the Shesheep 74A First Nations Indian reserve, which is located adjacent to the rural municipality of Grayson No. 184, Saskatchewan.

References 

Unincorporated communities in Saskatchewan